Ludvig Frands Adalbert Wimmer (Ringkøbing, Denmark, 7 February 1839 – Copenhagen 29 April 1920) was a Danish linguist and runologist. He was the first modern runic scholar, published his work Runeskriftens oprindelse og utvikling i norden. He proved that all runic alphabets went back to one basic futhark of 24 signs, which was known and used by all the Germanic tribes.

1839 births
1920 deaths
Linguists from Denmark
Runologists
Members of the Royal Society of Sciences in Uppsala